Kwame Ellis (born February 27, 1974) is a former American football defensive back. He played for the New York Jets in 1996.

References

1974 births
Living people
American football defensive backs
Stanford Cardinal football players
New York Jets players
Players of American football from Berkeley, California